The 2009 Fujitsu V8 Supercars Series was the tenth running of the V8 Supercar Development series. It supported the 2009 V8 Supercar Championship Series, beginning on 19 March at the Clipsal 500 and ending on 6 December at the Sydney 500 after seven rounds.

With one race to spare, Jonathon Webb secured the series, in doing so becoming the first driver from MW Motorsport to win the title after having competed in the very first series for second-tier V8 Supercars. James Moffat took second place from David Russell at the final race of the series. Ford drivers filled the top seven places with Grant Denyer, Daniel Gaunt, Brad Lowe and Damian Assaillit filling those positions. The first Holden driver was Sam Walter, over 900 points behind Webb.

Webb did not win a race until the fifth round of the series at Queensland Raceway, but from there won every race bar one, where he was second, an irresistible charge for the series that neither Moffat nor Russell had any answer to after the three drivers had been close for the first half of the series.

Calendar
The 2009 Fujitsu V8 Supercar Series on consisted of seven rounds:

Teams and drivers
The following teams and drivers have competed during the 2009 Fujitsu V8 Supercar Series.

Points system
Points are awarded to any driver that completes 75% of race distance and is running on the completion of the final lap. These are the points awarded for each race.

Driver standings

See also
2009 V8 Supercar season

References

Fujitsu V8 Supercars Series
Supercars Development Series